Meixi is an atonal pinyin romanization of various Chinese names, including:

 Meixi District in Yichun, Heilongjiang, PRC
 Meixi in Minqing Co., Fujian, PRC
 Meixi River in northeastern Chongqing Municipality, PRC